Turkey competed at the 2004 Summer Paralympics in Athens. The country was represented by eight athletes, who won a total of one gold medal and one bronze.

Medallists

Sports

Athletics

Men's track

Powerlifting

Men

Shooting

Swimming

Men

Table tennis

See also
2004 Summer Paralympics
Turkey at the Paralympics
Turkey at the 2004 Summer Olympics

External links
International Paralympic Committee

References

Nations at the 2004 Summer Paralympics
2004
Paralympics